Ghim Kumari Gurung (Nepali:घिम कुमारी गुरुङ) is a Nepalese women footballer who plays for the Nepal Army Club, and the Nepal women's national football team.

She played in the 12th South Asian Games representing Nepal

References

Nepalese women's footballers
Living people
Women's association football defenders
Year of birth missing (living people)
Gurung people
South Asian Games silver medalists for Nepal
South Asian Games medalists in football